Private transport (as opposed to public transport) is the personal or individual use of transportation which are not available for use by the general public, where in theory the user can decide freely on the time and route of transit ('choice rider' vs. 'captive rider'), using vehicles such as: private car, company car, bicycle, dicycle, self-balancing scooter, motorcycle, scooter, aircraft, boat, snowmobile, carriage, horse, etc., or recreational equipment such as roller skates, inline skates, sailboat, sailplane, skateboard etc.

Definition
Private transport is in contrast to public transport, and commercial non-public transport. While private transportation may be used alongside nearly all modes of public transportation, private railroad cars are rare (e.g. royal train), although heritage railways are not. Unlike many forms of public transportation, which may be government subsidized or operated by privately owned commercial organizations for mass or general public use, the entire cost of private transportation is born directly or indirectly by the individual user(s). However some scholars argue that it is inaccurate to say that the costs are covered by individual user because big (and often dominant) part of cost of private transportation is the cost of infrastructure on which individual trips rely. They therefore work also with model of quasi-private mobility.

Personal transport
Private transportation includes both non-motorized methods of private transit (pedestrians, cyclists, skaters, etc.) and all forms of self-propelled transport vehicles.

Shared personal transport

Non-public passenger transport in vehicles owned by the driver or passenger or operated by the driver.

Commercial transport

Shared vehicle fleets without driver
Self driven transport in vehicles not owned by either the passengers or driver.

Shared vehicle fleets with driver

Non-scheduled transit vehicles, taxicabs and rickshaws, which are rented or hired in the short-term on-demand with driver, belong, even if the user can freely decide on the time and route of transit, to the special forms of 'public transport'.

Shared individual vehicle journeys

Means of transport are fixed route and fixed schedule passenger services, for example, excursion riverboats, tourist cable cars, resort ski lifts.

Usage
Private transport is the dominant form of transportation in most of the world. In the United States, for example, 86.2% of passenger miles are by passenger vehicles, motorcycles, and trucks.

Examples of private transport

 Motorized:
 Automobile
 Motorboat
 Electric bicycle
 Electric skateboard
 Hovercraft
 Moped
 Motorcycle
 Motorized wheelchair
 Private aviation
 Private jet
 Motor ship
 Submarine
 Electric scooter
 Electric Unicycle
 Mobility scooter
 Non-motorized:
 Bicycle
 Horse-drawn vehicle
 Hot air balloon
 Ice skates
 Inline skates
 Pack animal
 Roller skates 
 Scooter
 Skateboard
 Walking
 Wheelchair

Sustainability
Cycling and walking, above all, have been recognized as the most sustainable transport systems. In general, all muscle-driven mobility will have a similar energy efficiency while at the same time being almost emission-free (apart from the  exhaled during breathing).

The negative environmental impact of private transport can be alleviated by choosing the optimal modal share for a given environment and transport requirements.

Dedicated infrastructure
Automobile repair shop
Controlled-access highway
Diner
Drive-thru
Drive-in theater
Filling station
Garage (residential)
Motel
Parking lot
Rest area
Retail park
Roadside zoo
Safari park

See also

 Auto rickshaw
 Air travel
 Chauffeur
 Taxicab
 Ridesharing company
 Vehicle for hire
 Peak car
 Car sharing
 Hitchhiking
 Mobilities
 Individual mobility
 Personal rapid transit

References